Chinese Apartment Art is the avant-garde art that was produced underground during the 1970s - 1990s in China. The word for apartment is gongyu in Chinese. The literal meaning of apartment is "government-owned residential complex" or "public house". Chinese artists created private work space within public residential complexes out of sight of authorities. The pieces tend to be smaller as to fit on the confines of the living spaces.

References

Chinese contemporary artists
Avant-garde art